Burke's Backyard was an Australian gardening and lifestyle series presented by horticulturist Don Burke, broadcast on both radio and television. On television, it was a regular weekly series on the Nine Network from 12 September 1987 to 26 November 2004.

History 

The program began on the Sydney AM radio station 2UE on Saturday and Sunday mornings before being picked up by the Nine Network in late 1987. Channel 9 broadcast the show on Friday evenings for the next 17 years. It is currently being broadcast on radio by 2UE and syndicated stations on Saturday and Sunday mornings. A magazine of the same name as the television program was published as a merchandising tie-in by Australian Consolidated Press. Don Burke went on to join Jamie Durie in creating the television show Backyard Blitz.

Cast 

The show was hosted by Don Burke but also included other presenters. The cooking segment was presented by Geoff Jansz, who also hosted the Channel Nine cooking shows What's Cooking and Fresh. Tara Dennis coordinated the fabrics and design section, while Rebecca Harris coordinated the pet section as she also did in her own Nine series Animal Hospital. Harris sometimes also appeared on the design and fabric segments. Scott Cam assisted Don as the building, gardening and design expert for more than half the program's duration. Other cast members included Ernie Dingo, Peter Harris, Dr. Chris Brown, Nigel Ruck, Jackie French, Elise Pascoe, Rita Hill, Dr. Harry Cooper, Reg Livermore and Rosemary Stanton.

For the 2007 television specials, Don Burke was assisted mainly by Rolf Harris . Former Olympic Gold Medalist swimmer Giaan Rooney also joined the cast for the specials, giving environmental tips, while financial expert Paul Clitheroe presented the financial section.

Theme song 
The theme to Burke's Backyard is a modified version of Bullamakanka's version of "Give Me a Home Among the Gumtrees" (Bob Brown; Walter Johnson Jr.). The chorus is as follows:
Give me a home among the gum trees, with lots of plum trees
A dog or two and a barbecue
flowers down the side
And veggies by the fence
all in Burke's Backyard

Ratings 
The television show was consistently a very strong ratings performer for the Nine Network. It occupied the Friday 7:30–8:30 timeslot for 17 years. During its final year, however, it rated poorly and was 'rested' by the Nine Network.

In the Spring special return in 2007, the show posted a very encouraging 10th place in the week's shows. It defeated both of its competing Seven Network shows including Australia's Best Backyards and Hot Property, and was the most watched Nine Network show of the week.

See also

 Better Homes and Gardens
 List of Australian television series
 List of Nine Network programs
 List of longest-running Australian television series

References

External links 
 
 
Burke's Backyard at the National Film and Sound Archive

Australian non-fiction television series
Nine Network original programming
Australian radio programs
1980s Australian radio programs
1990s Australian radio programs
2000s Australian radio programs
1987 Australian television series debuts
2004 Australian television series endings
1990s Australian television series
Gardening television